Nyong'o is a surname and may refer to:

 Isis Nyong'o, Kenyan business executive
 Lupita Nyong'o (born 1983), Kenyan actress and filmmaker
 Peter Anyang' Nyong'o (born 1945), Kenyan politician
 Tavia Nyong'o (born 1974), Kenyan-American cultural critic, historian and performance studies scholar